Blood of Saints is the third album from Swedish melodic death metal/industrial band Engel. This is the first Engel release to feature Jimmy Olausson on drums.

Track listing

Personnel
 Magnus "Mangan" Klavborn – vocals
 Niclas Engelin – guitars
 Marcus Sunesson – guitars
 Steve Drennan – bass
 Jimmy Olausson – drums

References 

2012 albums
Engel (band) albums
Season of Mist albums